CKDu or CKDU may refer to:

 Chronic kidney disease of unknown etiology
 Mesoamerican nephropathy, a CKDu in Central America
 CKDU-FM, a campus radio station of Dalhousie University, Nova Scotia, Canada